The goal of most research on group development is to learn why and how small groups change over time. To quality of the output produced by a group, the type and frequency of its activities, its cohesiveness, the existence of group conflict.

A number of theoretical models have been developed to explain how certain groups change over time. Listed below are some of the most common models. In some cases, the type of group being considered influenced the model of group development proposed as in the case of therapy groups.  In general, some of these models view group change as regular movement through a series of "stages", while others view them as "phases" that groups may or may not go through and which might occur at different points of a group's history.  Attention to group development over time has been one of the differentiating factors between the study of ad hoc groups and the study of teams such as those commonly used in the workplace, the military, sports and many other contexts.

Theories and models
In the early seventies, Hill and Grunner reported that more than 100 theories of group development existed.  Since then, other theories have emerged as well as attempts at contrasting and synthesizing them. As a result, a number of typologies of group change theories have been proposed.  A typology advanced by George Smith (2001) based on the work of Mennecke and his colleagues (1992) classifies theories based on whether they perceive change to occur in a linear fashion, through cycles of activities, or through processes that combine both paths of change, or which are completely non-phasic. Other typologies are based on whether the primary forces promoting change and stability in a group are internal or external to the group. A third framework advanced by Andrew Van de Ven and Marshall Scott Poole (1995), differentiates theories based on four distinct "motors" for generating change. According to this framework, the following four types of group development models exist:

Some theories allow for combinations and interactions among these four "motors". For example, Poole (see below) found in his empirical research that seemingly complex patterns of behavior in group decision making result from the interplay of life-cycle and teleological motors.

An important observation made by McGrath and Tschan in 2004 regarding the different models of group development found in the literature is that different models might explain different aspects of the history of a group. On the one hand, some models treat the group as an entity and describe its stages of development as a functioning unit or "intact system"  (p. 101).  In this case, the models should be independent of the specific details of the task that the group is performing.  On the other hand, some models might describe phases of the group's task performance and, because of this, tend to be very sensitive to the type of task that the group is engaged in (the "acting system", p. 101).

Below are descriptions of the central elements of some of the most common models of group development (See Smith, 2001  and Van de Ven & Poole, 1996  for a more complete list of theories and models).

Kurt Lewin's individual change process
The first systematic study of group development was carried out by Kurt Lewin, who introduced the term "group dynamics".  His ideas about mutual, cross-level influence and quasi-stationary equilibria, although uncommon in the traditional empirical research on group development, have resurged recently. His early model of individual change, which has served as the basis of many models of group development, described change as a three-stage process: unfreezing, change, and freezing.

Tuckman's Stages model
Bruce Tuckman reviewed about fifty studies of group development (including Bales' model) in the mid-sixties and synthesized their commonalities in one of the most frequently cited models of group development (Tuckman, 1965).  Tuckman's model of group development describes four linear stages (forming, storming, norming, and performing) that a group will go through in its unitary sequence of decision making.  A fifth stage (adjourning) was added in 1977 when a new set of studies were reviewed (Tuckman & Jensen, 1977).

Each of the five stages in the Forming-storming-norming-performing-adjourning model proposed by Tuckman involves two aspects: interpersonal relationships and task behaviors. Such a distinction is similar to Bales' (1950)  equilibrium model which states that a group continuously divides its attention between instrumental (task-related)  and expressive (socioemotional) needs.

As Gersick (1988)  has pointed out, some later  models followed similar sequential patterns.  Examples include: define the situation, develop new skills, develop appropriate roles, carry out the work (Hare, 1976); orientation, dissatisfaction, resolution, production, termination (LaCoursiere, 1980); and generate plans, ideas, and goals; choose & agree on alternatives, goals, and policies; resolve conflicts and develop norms; perform action tasks and maintain cohesion (McGrath, 1984).

Tubbs' systems model

Stewart Tubbs "systems" approach to studying small group interaction led him to the creation of a four-phase model of group development:

Fisher's theory of decision emergence in groups

Fisher outlines four phases through which task groups tend to proceed when engaged in decision making. By observing
the distribution of act-response pairs (a.k.a. "interacts") across different moments of the group process, Fisher noted how the interaction changed as the group decision was formulated and solidified. His method pays special attention to the "content" dimension of interactions by classifying statements in terms of how they respond to a decision proposal (e.g. agreement, disagreement, etc.).

Based on this categorization, Fisher created his "Decision Proposal Coding System" that identifies act-response pairs associated with each decision-making phase.  He observed that the group decision making process tended to be more cyclical and, in some cases, almost erratic. He hypothesized that the interpersonal demands of discussion require "breaks" from task work.  In particular, Fisher observed that there are a number of contingencies that might explain some of the decision paths taken by some groups.  For instance, in modifying proposals, groups tend to follow one of two patterns.  If conflict is low, the group will reintroduce proposals in less abstract, more specific language. When conflict is higher, the group might not attempt to make a proposal more specific but, instead, because disagreement lies on the basic idea, the group introduces substitute proposals of the same level of abstraction as the original.

Poole's multiple-sequences model

Marshall Scott Poole's model suggests that different groups employ different sequences in making decisions. In contrast to unitary sequence models, the multiple sequences model addresses decision making as a function of several contingency variables: task structure, group composition, and conflict management strategies. Poole developed a descriptive system for studying multiple sequences, beyond the abstract action descriptions of previous studies. From Bales' Interaction Process Analysis System and Fisher's Decision Proposal Coding System, Poole proposes 36 clusters of group activities for coding group interactions and 4 cluster-sets: proposal development, socioemotional concerns, conflict, and expressions of ambiguity. However, in his latter work, Poole rejected phasic models of group development and proposed a model of continuously developing threads of activity. In essence, discussions are not characterized by blocks of phases, one after another, but by intertwining tracks of activity and interaction.

Poole suggests three activity tracks: task progress, relational, and topical focus. Interspersed with these are breakpoints, marking changes in the development of strands and links between them. Normal breakpoints pace the discussion with topic shifts and adjournments. Delays, another breakpoint, are holding patterns of recycling through information. Finally, disruptions break the discussion threads with conflict or task failure.

McGrath's Time, Interaction, and Performance (TIP) theory
McGrath's (1991) work emphasized the notion that different teams might follow different developmental paths to reach the same outcome. He also suggested that teams engage in four modes of group activity: inception, technical problem solving, conflict resolution, and execution. According to this model, modes "are potential, not required, forms of activity" (p. 153) resulting in Modes I and IV (inception and execution) being involved in all group tasks and projects while Modes II (technical problem solving) and III (conflict resolution) may or may not be involved in any given group activity (Hare, 2003 uses the terms meaning, resources, integration, and goal attainment for these four modes).

McGrath further suggested that all team projects begin with Mode I (goal choice) and end with Mode IV (goal attainment) but that Modes II and III may or may not be needed depending on the task and the history of the group's activities. McGrath contended that for each identified function, groups can follow a variety of alternative "time-activity paths" in order to move from the initiation to the completion of a given function. Specifically, TIP theory states that there is a "default path" between two modes of activity which is "satisficing" or "least effort" path, and that such default path will "prevail unless conditions warrant some more complex path" (1991, p. 159).
 

This model also states that groups adopt these four modes with respect to each of three team functions: production, well-being, and member support. In this sense, groups are seen as "always acting in one of the four modes with respect to each of the three functions, but they are not necessarily engaged in the same mode for all functions, nor are they necessarily engaged in the same mode for a given function on different projects that may be concurrent" (McGrath, 1991, p. 153). The following table illustrates the relationship between modes and functions.

(Adapted from Figure 1 in McGrath, 1991, p. 154)

Gersick's punctuated equilibrium model

Gersick's study of naturally occurring groups departs from the traditionally linear models of group development. Her punctuated equilibrium model (Gersick, 1988, 1989, 1991) suggests that groups develop through the sudden formation, maintenance, and sudden revision of a "framework for performance". This model describes the processes through which such frameworks are formed and revised and predicts both the timing of progress and when and how in their development groups are likely, or unlikely, to be influenced by their environments. The specific issues and activities that dominate groups' work are left unspecified in the model, since groups' historical paths are expected to vary. Her proposed model works in the following way.

Wheelan's integrated model of group development

Building on Tuckman's model and based on her own empirical research as well as the foundational work of Wilfred Bion, Susan Wheelan proposed a "unified" or "integrated" model of group development (Wheelan, 1990; Wheelan, 1994a).  This model, although linear in a sense, takes the perspective that groups achieve maturity as they continue to work together rather than simply go through stages of activity.  In this model, "early" stages of group development are associated with specific issues and patterns of talk such as those related to dependency, counter-dependency, and trust which precede the actual work conducted during the "more mature” stages of a group's life.  The table below describes each one of these phases.

Based on this model, Wheelan has created and validated both a Group Development Observation System (GDOS) and a Group Development Questionnaire (GDQ).  The GDOS allows researchers to determine the developmental stage of a group by categorizing and counting each complete thought exhibited during a group session into one of eight categories: Dependency statements, Counterdependency, Fight, Flight, Pairing, Counterpairing, Work, or Unscorable statements (Wheelan, 1994).  The GDQ is used to survey group members and assess their individual perception of their group's developmental state (Wheelan, S., & Hochberger, 1996). Her academic work has been transferred into a commercial organization,   GDQ Associates, Inc.

In her empirical validation of the model, Wheelan (2003) has analyzed the relationship between the length of time that a group has been meeting and the verbal behavior patterns of its members as well as the member's perceptions of the state of development of the group.  Her results seem to indicate that there is a significant relationship between the length of time that a group had been meeting and the verbal behavior patterns of its members.  Also, members of older groups tended to perceive their groups to have more of the characteristics of Stage-3 and Stage-4 groups and to be more productive. Based on these results, Wheelan's position supports the traditional linear models of group development and casts doubt on the cyclic models and Gersick's punctuated equilibrium model.

Morgan, Salas & Glickman's TEAM model

Combining multiple theories and the development models of Tuckman and Gersick, Morgan, Salas and Glickman (1994) created the Team Evolution and Maturation (TEAM) model to describe a series of nine developmental stages through which newly formed, task-oriented teams are hypothesized to evolve. The periods of development are labeled "stages" and conceived to be "relatively informal, indistinct, and overlapping", because "sharp demarcations are not often characteristic of the dynamic situations in which operational teams work and develop". According to this model, teams might begin a given period of development at different stages and spend different amounts of time in the various stages.  Teams are not always expected to progress in a linear fashion through all of the stages. A team's beginning point and pattern of progression through the stages depend on factors such as the characteristics of the team and team members, their past histories and experience, the nature of their tasks, and the environmental demands and constraints (cf. McGrath, 1991).

The TEAM model identities a total of nine stages, seven central ones supplemented by two additional ones. The seven central stages begin with the formation of the team during its first meeting (forming) and moves through the members' initial, and sometimes unstable, exploration of the situation (storming), initial efforts toward accommodation and the formation and acceptance of roles (norming), performance leading toward occasional inefficient patterns of performance (performing-I), reevaluation and transition (reforming), refocusing of efforts to produce effective performance (performing-11), and completion of team assignments (conforming). The development of a team might be recycled from any of the final stages to an earlier stage if necessitated by a failure to achieve satisfactory performance or if adjustments to environmental demands are required or if problematic team interactions develop.

The core stages of the model are preceded by a pre-forming stage that recognizes the forces from the environment (environmental demands and constraints) that call for, and contribute to, the establishment of the team; that is, forces external
to the team (before it comes into existence) that cause the team to be formed. The last stage indicates that after the team has served its purpose, it will eventually be disbanded or de-formed. Here, individuals exit from the group (separately or
simultaneously) and the team loses its identity and ceases to exist.

The TEAM model also postulates the existence of two distinguishable activity tracks present throughout all the stages. The first of these tracks involves activities that are tied to the specific task(s) being performed. These activities include interactions of the team members with tools and machines, the technical aspects of the job (e.g., procedures, policies, etc.), and other task-related activities.  The other track of activities is devoted to enhancing the quality of the interactions, interdependencies, relationships, affects, cooperation, and coordination of teams.

The proponents of the model did not test its components or sequence of stages empirically but did confirm that the perceptions of team members concerning the performance processes of the team are perceived to include both team-centered and task-centered activities and that these perceptions seem to change over time as a result of team training.

Hackman's Multilevel Perspective

Since its beginning, the study of group dynamics has caused disagreement between researchers, as some maintain the focus should be at the individual-level, and others maintain the focus should be at the group-level. The Multilevel Perspective is an integration of these analyses into one unified approach. It suggests that group development and success can be best understood by taking into account components found at all levels of analysis.

Group behavior can be broken down into 3 levels of analysis: the individual level (micro), the group level (meso) and the organizational or societal level (macro).

Hackman (2003) warns that the scientific community has a tendency towards what is termed, “explanatory reductionism” or the tendency to believe that the workings of all natures systems can be explained by the properties of the parts that make them up. In truth, highly complex systems, such as groups, can have components that cannot be explained by looking at the properties of say, the individual. In order to get a true understanding of group dynamics, it is important that one focuses on the big picture.

Hackman (2003) emphasizes this point via an example of his previous research on the effectiveness of airline cockpit crews. The study looked at 300 crews from various airlines located in the U.S., Europe, and Asia (Hackman, 1993). The crews varied based on success, and the current barriers they were facing, which included things such as economic difficulty and other external stressors.

At first, the analysis included structural features (design of the flying task and the crew itself) that were assessed using methods that included surveys, interviews, and reviews of training and procedure manuals. Once the data analysis began, a one-way analysis of variance showed that the airlines had nearly no variation on measures of crew structure and behavior. These results were quite contradictory to what had been expected, but fortunately, Hackman had also collected data on a number of individual and contextual factors, just in case. At the individual level, it appeared as though the airlines once again did not vary significantly, but at the organizational level the source of variance was found. It turned out that the variability in crew success was related to each crew's organizational context. A total of five key features were determinants of crew success: adequacy of material resources, clarity of performance objectives, recognition and reinforcement for excellent crew performance, availability of educational and technical assistance, and availability of informational resources. If the researchers had chosen to collect data at just one level of analysis (e.g. the group level) the study would not have produced significant results.

When studying group development and dynamics, it is important that all levels of analysis are taken into consideration. While it may be tempting to focus mainly at the group level, important information may be present either one level up (the organizational level) or one level down (the individual level).

Chaos Theory of Nonlinear Dynamics

Chaos Theory is a concept taken from the physical sciences. It challenges models that postulate linear and sequential processes, and instead suggests that development is inherently unpredictable. Chaos theory argues that it's unrealistic for a system to go through deterministic, predictable, and repeated stages. It was first applied to group development literature by McClure (1998) to suggest how groups never repeats themselves in the 'exact' same way, but that teams go through periods of chaos where the trajectory of the group is determined through conflict, turbulence, and uncertainty.

However, there is some order that is created out of chaos. When a system is prone to be resolved in a certain way, but is not determined by a certain trajectory or constrained by time then this system is said to have a strange attractor. For groups, working as a functioning, effective team serves as the strange attractor, because this is the state groups naturally wish to return to after a chaotic period.

This has been applied to research on hazing and initiation rituals  to examine how the process of initiation for sport teams place the group in an unfamiliar state, to which group development is unpredictable, and can result in various outcomes dependent on the individual and the leadership of the team. Further, the influence of leadership within a chaotic system has been examined to ascertain how turbulent processes can be managed or guided towards successful outcomes.

Further challenges

Apart from the question of the validity of the research methods used and the generalizations that can be made based on the types of groups studied, there still remain some significant challenges in the study of group development. As some researchers have pointed out (e.g. Tuckman, 1965) group development models often provide only snapshots of groups at certain points of their history but do not fully describe the mechanisms of change, the "triggers" that lead to change or the amount of time that a group might remain in a  stage. Furthermore, naturally occurring groups tend to be highly sensitive to outside influences and environmental contingencies, but few models account for these influences.

Models of "small" group development are also related to those of organization development but operate at a different level of analysis.  Despite their differences, both areas of work attempt to understand patterns and processes of collective change.  Both fields should strive to develop "process-oriented" theories, which according to Poole and Van de Ven (2004):

 Provide a deep understanding of how change comes about by describing the generative mechanism that drives the process;
 Can account for path dependence and the role of critical events in change and innovation; and 
 Can incorporate the role of human agency in change without reducing it to causal terms.

A number of questions still remain unanswered in the study of group development over time.  As McGrath and Tschan (2004) stated, some of these challenges include:

 Do groups of all types change in the same way?
 Are the temporal patterns in groups in fact developmental stages with the changes patterned so that the same kinds of structures and processes occur in the same fixed sequences for all groups?
 If there is a fixed sequence of stages of development, are the stages of equal or different durations?  Do all groups go through these stages at the same rate?
 Is the pattern of stages immutable or subject to alteration by unique circumstances or events external to the group?
 If a given group does not follow a fixed sequence of stages, is variation in the sequence indicative of malfunction in the group's development or maturation, or does it merely express normal variation arising from initial or contextual conditions?  (p.102)

See also
 Group dynamics
 Team work
 Team building
 Human Systems Intervention

Notes

References
 Arrow, H. (1997). Stability, bistability, and instability in small group influence patterns. Journal of Personality and Social Psychology, 72, 75–85.
 Arrow, H., Henry, K. B., Poole, M. S., Wheelan, S. A., &  Moreland, R. L. (2005). Traces, trajectories, and timing: The temporal perspective on groups.  In M. S. Poole & A. B. Hollingshead (Eds.), Theories of small groups: Interdisciplinary perspectives. Thousand Oaks, CA: Sage.
 Bales, R. F. (1950), Interaction Process Analysis: A Method for the Study of Small Groups, Addison-Wesley.
 Bales, R. F. (1953), The equilibrium problem in small groups, in T. Parsons, R. F. Bales and E. A. Shils (eds.), Working Papers in the Theory of Action, Free Press, 111–61.
 Bales, R. F., and Strodtbeck, F. L. (1951), Phases in group problem-solving, Journal of Abnormal and Social Psychology, 46(4), 485–95.
 Bion, W. R. (1961). Experiences in Groups and Other Papers, Ney York, Basic Books.
 Chang, A., Duck, J., & Bordia, P. (2006). Understanding the multidimensionality of group development. Small Group Research, 37 (4), 327–350.
 Fisher, B. A. (1970). Decision emergence: Phases in group decision making. Speech Monographs, 37, 53–66.
 Forsyth, D. R. (2003). Group Dynamics (5th ed., pp. 19–23). Belmont, CA: Wadsworth.
 Gersick, C. J. G. (1988). Time and transition in work teams: Toward a new model of group development. The Academy of Management Journal, 31 (1), 9–41.
 Gersick, C. J. G. (1989). Marking time: Predictable transitions in task groups. The Academy of Management Journal, 32 (2), 274–309.
 Gersick, C. J. G. (1991). Revolutionary change theories: A multilevel exploration of the punctuated equilibrium paradigm. The Academy of Management Review, 16 (1), 10–36.
 Hackman, J. R. (1993). Teams, leaders, and organizations: new directions for crew-oriented flight training. In E. L. Wiener, B. G. Kanki, & R. L. Helmreich (Eds.), Cockpit resource management (pp. 47–69). Orlando, FL: Academic Press. 
 Hackman, J. R. (2003). Learning more by crossing levels: evidence from airplanes, hospitals, and orchestras. Journal of Organizational Behavior, 24, 905–922. doi:10.1002/job.226
 Hare, A. P. (1976). Handbook of small group research (2nd ed.). New York: Free Press.
 Hare, P. (2003). Roles, relationships, and groups in organizations: Some conclusions and recommendations. Small Group Research, 34 (2), 123–154.
 Hill, W. F., & Gruner, L. (1973). A study of development in open and closed groups. Small Group Behavior, 4(3), 355–381.
 Lacoursiere, R. B. (1980). The life cycle of groups. New York: Human Sciences Press.
 Lewin, K. (1947). Frontiers in group dynamics: Concept, method and reality in social science; social equilibria and social change. Human Relations, 1 (1), 5–41.
 McClure, Bud (1998). Putting a new spin on groups: The science of chaos. New Jersey: Lawrence Erlbaum Associates.
 McGrath, J. E. (1984). Groups: Interaction and performance. Englewood Cliffs, N.J.: Prentice Hall.
 McGrath, J. E. (1991). Time, interaction, and performance (TIP): A theory of groups. Small Group Research, 22 (2), 147–174.
 McGrath, J. E., & Tschan, F. (2004). Temporal matters in social psychology: Examining the role of time in the lives of groups and individuals. Washington, DC: American Psychological Association.
 Mennecke, B. E., Hoffer, J. A., & Wynee, B. E. (1992). The implications of group development and history for group support system theory and practice. Small Group Research, 23(4), 524–572.
 Moreland, R. L., & Levine, J. M. (1988) Group dynamics over time: Development and socialization in small groups. In J. McGrath (Ed.), The social psychology of time: New perspectives (pp. 151–181). Newbury Park, CA: Sage.
 Morgan, B. B., Salas, E., & Glickman, A. S. (1994). An analysis of team evolution and maturation. The Journal of General Psychology, 120 (3), 277–291.
 Poole, M. S. (1981). Decision development in small groupsI: A comparison of two models. Communication Monographs, 48, 1–24;
 Poole, M. S. (1983). Decision development in small groups II: A study of multiple sequences in decision making. Communication Monographs, 50, 206–232
 Poole, M. S. (1983). Decision development in small groups III: A multiple sequence model of group decision development. Communication Monographs, 50, 321–341
 Poole, M. S., & Roth, J. (1989). Decision development in small groups V: Test of a contingency model. Human Communication Research, 15, 549–589.
 Poole, M. S., & Holmes, M. E. (1995) Decision development in computer-assisted group decision making. Human Communication Research; 22(1) p. 90 -127
 Poole, M. S., & Van de Ven, A. H. (2004). Central issues in the study of change and innovation. In Poole, M. S. & A. H. Van de Ven (Eds.), Handbook of organizational change and innovation (pp. 3–31). Oxford: Oxford University Press.
 Schneider, M.; Somers, M. (2006). Organizations as complex adaptive systems: Implications of complexity theory for leadership research. The Leadership Quarterly. 17 (4): 351–365.
 Smith, G. (2001) Group development: A review of the literature and a commentary on future research directions. Group Facilitation; 3, pp. 14–45.
 Thompson, J.; Johnstone, J.; Banks, C. (2018). An examination of initiation rituals in a UK sporting institution and the impact on group development. European Sport Management Quarterly. 18 (5): 544–562. doi:10.1080/16184742.2018.1439984
 Tubbs, S. (1995). A systems approach to small group interaction. New York: McGraw-Hill, 1995.
 Tuckman, B. W. (1965). Developmental sequence in small groups. Psychological Bulletin, 63, 384–399.
 Tuckman, B. W. & Jensen, M. A. (1977). Stages of small-group development revisited. Group Org. Studies 2:419-27
 Van de Ven, A., Poole, M. S. (1996). Explaining Development and Change in Organizations. The Academy of Management Review, Vol. 20, No. 3, pp. 510–540
 Wheelan, S., Davidson, B., & Tilin, F. (2003). Group development across time:  Reality or illusion? Small Group Research, 34 (2), 223–245.
 Wheelan, S. A. (1990). Facilitating training groups: A guide to leadership and verbal intervention skills. New York: Praeger.
 Wheelan, S. A. (1994a). Group processes: A developmental perspective. Boston: Allyn & Bacon.
 Wheelan, S. A. (1994b). The Group Development Questionnaire: A manual for professionals. Provincetown, MA: GDQ Associates.
 Wheelan, S., & Hochberger, J. (1996). Validation studies of the group development questionnaire. Small Group Research, 27, 143–170.

Group processes
Human communication
Social work

de:Teamentwicklung